Quake may refer to:

Seismology
 Earthquake, a shaking of the earth's surface
 Quake (natural phenomenon), surface shaking on any astronomical body

Arts and entertainment
 Quake (album), a 2003 album by Erik Friedlander
 Quake (film), a 1992 American direct-to-video film
 The Quake (film), a 2018 Norwegian film
 Quake (series), a series of first-person shooter games
 Quake (video game), the 1996 first game in the series
 Quake engine, a game engine by ID Software, first used in the 1996 game
 Quake (original soundtrack), by Trent Reznor and Nine Inch Nails, 1996
 Quake II engine, the 1997 second iteration of the game engine, first used in Quake II
 WQKE, The Quake, an FM radio station in Plattsburgh, New York, US
 Quake, a Transformers comics character
 Quake, a superhero code name used by the Marvel Comics character Daisy Johnson

Other uses
 Quake (cereal), a breakfast cereal marketed with Quisp
 Quake Inc., now Exit Tunes, Inc., a Japanese media company
 Quake Lake, a lake in Montana, US
 Stephen Quake (born 1969), American scientist

See also
Earthquake (disambiguation)
Quaker (disambiguation)